John Deffenbaugh is an American politician from Georgia. Deffenbaugh is a former Republican member of Georgia House of Representatives for district 1.

Education 
In 1970, Deffenbaugh earned a bachelor of art degree in Physics from Covenant College.

Career 
In military, Deffenbaugh had served in the U.S. Air force and U.S. Navy Reserve.

Deffenbaugh was a salesman for Horizon Electronics in Chattanooga, Tennessee.

In 1996, Deffenbaugh's political career began as a member of the Dade County Board of Commissioner.

In 2013, Deffenbaugh won the election for Georgia House of Representatives for district 1. He is a Republican.

In the 2018 election, Deffenbaugh lost the election for district 1 to Colton Moore. Deffenbaugh's term as a member of the Georgia House of Representatives for the 1st district will not continue after January 2019. In 2020, Deffenbaugh sought election to his former House of Representatives seat and was in a run-off against Mr. Mike Cameron.

Personal life 
Deffenbaugh's wife is Linda. They have two sons, Matthew and Ethan. Deffenbaugh resides in Lookout Mountain, Georgia.

See also 
 2018 Georgia House of Representatives election (Deffenbaugh  lost district 1)

References

External links 
 John Deffenbaugh at AtlanticUnfiltered.com
 2014 Runoff election at wrcbtv.com(Deffenbaugh won district1)

Year of birth missing (living people)
Living people
Place of birth missing (living people)
Covenant College alumni
21st-century American politicians
Republican Party members of the Georgia House of Representatives